Leslie Holton (13 March 1903 – 1 February 1956) was an Australian cricketer. He played in two first-class matches for South Australia between 1929 and 1933.

See also
 List of South Australian representative cricketers

References

External links
 

1903 births
1956 deaths
Australian cricketers
South Australia cricketers
Cricketers from Melbourne